Osio Sotto is a comune (municipality) in the Province of Bergamo in the Italian region of Lombardy, located about  northeast of Milan and about  southwest of Bergamo.

Founded in Roman times, the comune is currently the tenth municipality in the province of Bergamo by population, and the fourth of the southern Bergamo region.

Osio Sotto borders the following municipalities: Boltiere, Brembate, Filago, Levate, Osio Sopra, Verdellino.

Population history

References